Danilo Russo (born 8 July 1987) is an Italian footballer who plays as a goalkeeper for  club Juve Stabia.

Club career

Youth and loan career
Born in Pompei, the Province of Naples, Russo started his career at Genoa. In January 2006 he left for Serie C2 side Pergocrema. He was the backup of Stefano Belussi. In 2006, he was re-signed by Serie B club Genoa for €180,000. Due to Article 33 of NOIF (Norme organizzative interne of FIGC) restricted "young professional" and trainee to sign a contract for more than 3 years, Russo signed a contract until 30 June 2009. He was the backup of Rubinho, Nicola Barasso and Alessio Scarpi; was award no.57 shirt. He also played for the Primavera under-20 team.

In 2007-08 season, he left for Serie C2 side Viareggio on loan, ahead Andrea Carpita as first choice. In 2008-09 season, he left for Lega Pro Prima Divisione side Pergocrema again (along with Paolo Facchinetti and Michele Tarallo), but now as first choice ahead Pierluigi Brivio. Russo also extended his contract twice with Genoa to 30 June 2010 and 2013 during 2008–09 season and effective on the first half and second half of 2009 financial year of the club. Despie Russo made 33 appearances for Viareggio, made him became "professional" and eligible to sign a contract for a maximum of 5-year, at first he only added a year to his contract and the performance at Pergocrema made him earned 3 more year to his contract. The amortization cost for his contract value was lowered from €60,000 per season from 2006–07 & 2007–08 season to €40,000 in 2008–09 and €2,500 in the first half of 2009–10. However it was counter-weight by the wage of the professional contract.

Return to Genoa
In 2009-10 season, he returned to Genoa of Serie A as third keeper behind Marco Amelia and Alessio Scarpi, as youth product Eugenio Lamanna left the club. He took no.1 shirt from Lamanna.

Vicenza
In January 2010, he left for Vicenza in co-ownership deal in exchanged with Alberto Frison left for Genoa on loan. Half of Russo's registration rights was tagged for a peppercorn fee of €500 only, which Genoa had to write-down €16,500. (Residual value €17,500 minus selling price €1,000) He took no.1 shirt from Frison but as Marco Fortin's backup, ahead Cristian Cicioni and José Rocchi. In 2010–11 Serie B, he played 29 Serie B games as Fortin retired, while Frison became his understudy.

Spezia
In June 2011 Genoa bought back Russo for a peppercorn fee of €500 and on 6 July 2011 he was transferred to Spezia. He won Supercoppa di Lega di Prima Divisione (the grand champion of third division) as well as Coppa Italia Lega Pro (Italian Lega Pro Cup). The club also promoted back to Serie B.

Pro Vercelli
On 12 August 2013, he joined Pro Vercelli in co-ownership deal in exchanged with Alex Valentini left for Spezia also in co-ownership.

Venezia
In mid-2017 Russo left for Venezia.

Return to Juve Stabia
On 24 July 2019, he returned to Juve Stabia, after it has been promoted to Serie B.

International career
He capped 3 times for Italy U17 at 2004 UEFA European Under-17 Football Championship qualification, and another 3 as unused bench for Andrea Consigli. He never call-up to U19 team as the coach preferred Consigli, Giacomo Bindi, Salvatore Sirigu and Lorenzo Farinelli. After the U19 failed to qualify to second qualify round of 2006 UEFA European Under-19 Football Championship, Russo was promoted to Italy U20 team, the feeder team of U21 team along with Bindi (capped twice) and Consigli (capped once), for 2005-06 Four Nations Tournament. He played once out of possible 5 with last match (the final) played by Daniele Padelli.

Due to club performance he did not receive U21 call-up but Consigli and Sirigu did.

Honours
Spezia
 Supercoppa di Lega di Prima Divisione: 2012
 Lega Pro Prima Divisione: 2012
 Coppa Italia Lega Pro: 2012

References

External links
http://aic.football.it/scheda/16758/russo-danilo.htm
http://www.figc.it/nazionali/DettaglioConvocato?codiceConvocato=2646&squadra=11

1987 births
Living people
People from Pompei
Footballers from Campania
Italian footballers
Association football goalkeepers
Serie B players
Serie C players
Lega Pro Seconda Divisione players
U.S. Pergolettese 1932 players
Genoa C.F.C. players
F.C. Esperia Viareggio players
L.R. Vicenza players
Spezia Calcio players
F.C. Pro Vercelli 1892 players
Matera Calcio players
S.S. Juve Stabia players
Venezia F.C. players
Casertana F.C. players
Italy youth international footballers